The log-distance path loss model is a radio propagation model that predicts the path loss a signal encounters inside a building or densely populated areas over distance.

Mathematical formulation

The model

Log-distance path loss model is formally expressed as:

 

where

  is the total path loss in decibels (dB).
  is the transmitted power in dBm where  is the transmitted power in watts.
  is the received power in dBm where  is the received power in watts.
  is the path loss in decibels (dB) at the reference distance  calculated using the Friis free-space path loss model.
  is the length of the path.
  is the reference distance, usually 1 km (or 1 mile) for a large cell and 1 m to 10 m for a microcell.
  is the path loss exponent.
  is a normal (or Gaussian) random variable with zero mean, reflecting the attenuation (in decibels) caused by flat fading. In the case of no fading, this variable is 0. In the case of only shadow fading or slow fading, this random variable may have Gaussian distribution with  standard deviation in decibels, resulting in a log-normal distribution of the received power in watts. In the case of only fast fading caused by multipath propagation, the corresponding fluctuation of the signal envelope in volts may be modelled as a random variable with Rayleigh distribution or Ricean distribution (and thus the corresponding gain in watts  may be modelled as a random variable with exponential distribution).

Corresponding non-logarithmic model
This corresponds to the following non-logarithmic gain model:

 

where

 is the average multiplicative gain at the reference distance  from the transmitter. This gain depends on factors such as carrier frequency, antenna heights and antenna gain, for example due to directional antennas; and

 is a stochastic process that reflects flat fading. In case of only slow fading (shadowing), it may have log-normal distribution with parameter  dB. In case of only fast fading due to multipath propagation, its amplitude may have Rayleigh distribution or Ricean distribution. This can be convenient, because Power (Watts) is proportional to the square of amplitude. Squaring a Rayleigh-distributed random variable produces an  Exponentially-distributed random variable. In many cases, exponential distributions are computationally convenient and allow direct closed-form calculations in many more situations than a Rayleigh (or even a Gaussian).

Empirical coefficient values for indoor propagation

See also
ITU model for indoor attenuation
Radio propagation model
Young model

References

Further reading
 
 

Radio frequency propagation model